Ungnadia is a genus of flowering plants in the family Sapindaceae containing one species, Ungnadia speciosa, the Mexican buckeye. It is native to northern Mexico, as well as Texas and southern New Mexico in the United States. The name honours Austrian ambassador Baron David von Ungnad, who brought the horse chestnut to Vienna in 1576, introducing the plant into western Europe.

It differs from the buckeyes in the related genus Aesculus  but the seeds and nuts are similar. Another similar related genus is the soapberry (genus Sapindus). Ungnadia seeds are poisonous despite their sweetness, and sometimes used as marbles. The foliage is toxic and rarely browsed by livestock, but bees produce honey from the floral nectar.

Description
Ungnadia speciosa a deciduous shrub or small tree (< 25 ft) that is often multi trunked. The leaves (5 – 12 in) are alternate and pinnately compound with 5 - 9 leaflets.  The leaflets are long (3 – 5 in), narrow, and pointed with slight serrations.

References

External links

Benny Simpson's Texas Native Shrubs
Lady Bird Johnson Wildflower Center

Trees of Chihuahua (state)
Trees of Coahuila
Trees of the South-Central United States
Trees of Nuevo León
Trees of Tamaulipas
Monotypic Sapindaceae genera
Sapindaceae